Bhutan participated in the 2014 Asian Beach Games held in Phuket, Thailand, from 14 to 23 November 2014. Bhutan competed in 3x3 Beach Basketball and sent 4 athletes but failed to win any medals.

Medal summary

Medal by Sport

Medal by Date

External links 

 Official Site

References 

2014 in Bhutanese sport
Nations at the 2014 Asian Beach Games
Bhutan at the Asian Games